The men's 110 metres hurdles event at the 2004 World Junior Championships in Athletics was held in Grosseto, Italy, at Stadio Olimpico Carlo Zecchini on 16, 17 and 18 July.  106.7 cm (3'6) (senior implement) hurdles were used.

Medalists

Results

Final
18 July
Wind: -0.6 m/s

Semifinals
17 July

Semifinal 1
Wind: -0.3 m/s

Semifinal 2
Wind: -0.5 m/s

Heats
16 July

Heat 1
Wind: -0.1 m/s

Heat 2
Wind: +1.2 m/s

Heat 3
Wind: +1.8 m/s

Heat 4
Wind: +1.8 m/s

Heat 5
Wind: +1.3 m/s

Participation
According to an unofficial count, 37 athletes from 28 countries participated in the event.

References

110 metres hurdles
Sprint hurdles at the World Athletics U20 Championships